Ulf Pilgaard (born 15 November 1940) is a Danish actor. The son of a priest, he studied theology but changed his career to acting. He is married.
He has been an important part of Cirkusrevyen for 28 years. He has appeared on several films e.g.

He won both the Bodil Award and Robert Award for best leading actor for his role in Farligt venskab.

Selected filmography

References

External links 
 

1940 births
20th-century Danish male actors
21st-century Danish male actors
Best Actor Robert Award winners
Best Actor Bodil Award winners
Danish male film actors
Living people
People from Skive Municipality